"Friend of Mine" is a song by Australian rock band The Screaming Jets. The song was released in October 1995 as the second single from their third studio and self titled studio album (1995). The song peaked at number 44 on the ARIA Charts.

Track listings
 CD Single
 "Friend of Mine" - 3:41
 "Sad Song"  (live)  - 2:59
 "Life and Death" (live)  - 3:47
 "Disappear"  (live)  - 3:24
 Tracks 2, 3 & 4 Recorded at the Kirk Gallery for Triple J "Live at the Wireless" on 15 August 1995.

Charts

Release history

References

1995 songs
1995 singles
The Screaming Jets songs